Senožaty is a municipality and village in Pelhřimov District in the Vysočina Region of the Czech Republic. It has about 800 inhabitants.

Administrative parts
Villages of Nečice, Otavožaty and Tukleky are administrative parts of Senožaty.

References

Villages in Pelhřimov District